Union Sportive Macouria is a French Guiana football team playing at the top level. It is based in Macouria.  Their home stadium is Stade Municipal.

Achievements
French Guiana Championnat National: 1
 2006/07
Coupe de Guyane: 1
 2005/06

The club in the French football structure
French Cup: 2 appearances (0 wins)
1995/96, 2004/05

Squad 2007/08

References
Official Website

Football clubs in French Guiana